In mathematics, permutation relates to the act of arranging all the members of a set into some sequence or order.

Permutation may also refer to:

 An alteration or transformation of a previous object or concept; see iteration
 Permutation, as a mathematical concept
 Permutation test in statistics
 Permutation (Cryptography), a series of linked mathematical operations used in block cipher algorithms such as AES.
 Permutation box, a cryptography method of bit shuffling used to permute or transpose bits across S-boxes.
 Permutation (music), as a concept related to musical set theory
 Permutation (Amon Tobin album), 1998
 Permutation (Bill Laswell album), 1999
 "Permutation" (song), an instrumental song by the Red Hot Chili Peppers